KBOT (104.1 FM, "Wave 104.1") is a radio station licensed to Pelican Rapids, Minnesota that serves Detroit Lakes, Minnesota. The station is owned by Leighton Broadcasting. The station has an adult contemporary format, and is advertised along with sisters stations AM 1340 KDLM, and Real Country 102.3 KRCQ on a billboard at the KDLM studio outside Detroit Lakes.

History
On September 22, 2010 KBOT dropped its previous country format as "Wild 104.1" and began stunting as "All Request 104.1". On September 27, 2010, KBOT officially announced the station's new name, as "Wave 104.1".

Internet Radio
Wave 104.1 offers a link on their website to stream the live broadcast via popup.

External links

Radio stations in Minnesota
Radio stations established in 1986
1986 establishments in Minnesota